Caeau Cefn Cribwr is a Site of Special Scientific Interest near Cefn Cribwr in Bridgend, south Wales.

The Countryside Council for Wales states that the site has been categorised as a Site of Special Interest for "...its marshy grassland and species-rich neutral grassland. Smaller areas of wet heath, woodland and scrub add to the interest. It is also of special interest for populations of three rare plants: marsh fern, soft-leaved sedge and viper's grass. Marsh Fritillary butterfly can be found here."

See also
List of Sites of Special Scientific Interest in Mid & South Glamorgan

Notes

Sites of Special Scientific Interest in Bridgend County Borough